Jayaram Jayalalithaa (24 February 1948 – 5 December 2016) was an Indian politician and actress who served as Chief Minister of Tamil Nadu for more than fourteen years over six terms between 1991 and 2016. From 9 February 1989 to 5 December 2016, she was the 5th and longest-serving general secretary of the All India Anna Dravida Munnetra Kazhagam (AIADMK), a Dravidian party whose cadre revered her as their "" (Mother) and "" (Revolutionary leader).

Overview 
Jayalalithaa rose to prominence as a leading film actress in the mid-1960s. Though she had begun her acting career reluctantly at her mother's behest to support the family, Jayalalithaa was a prolific actor. She appeared in 140 films between 1961 and 1980, primarily in the Tamil, Telugu and Kannada languages. Jayalalithaa received praise for her versatility as an actress and her dancing skills, earning the sobriquet "Queen of Tamil Cinema". Among her frequent co-stars was M. G. Ramachandran, popularly known as 'M.G.R.', a Tamil cultural icon who leveraged his immense popularity with the masses into a successful political career. In 1982, when M.G.R. was chief minister, Jayalalithaa joined the AIADMK, the party he founded. Her political rise was rapid; within a few years she became AIADMK propaganda secretary and was elected to the Rajya Sabha, the upper house of India's Parliament. After M.G.R.'s death in 1987, Jayalalithaa proclaimed herself as his political heir and, having fought off the faction headed by M.G.R.'s widow,  V. N. Janaki Ramachandran, emerged as the sole leader of the AIADMK. Following the 1989 election, she became Leader of the Opposition to the DMK-led government headed by M. Karunanidhi, her bête noire.
In 1991, Jayalalithaa became chief minister for the first time and Tamil Nadu's youngest. She earned a reputation for centralising state power among a coterie of bureaucrats; her council of ministers, whom she often shuffled around, were largely ceremonial in nature. The successful cradle-baby scheme, which enabled mothers to anonymously offer their newborns for adoption, emerged during this time. Despite an official salary of only a rupee a month, Jayalalithaa indulged in public displays of wealth, culminating in a lavish wedding for her foster son V. N. Sudhakaran (Sasikala's elder sister son) on 7 September 1995. In the 1996 election, the AIADMK was nearly wiped out at the hustings; Jayalalithaa herself lost her seat. The new Karunanidhi government filed several corruption cases against her, and she had to spend time in jail. Her fortunes revived in the 1998 general election, as the AIADMK became a key component of Prime Minister Atal Bihari Vajpayee's 1998–99 government; her withdrawal of support toppled it and triggered another general election just a year later.

The AIADMK returned to power in 2001, although Jayalalithaa was personally disbarred from contesting due to the corruption cases. Within a few months of her taking oath as chief minister, in September 2001, she was disqualified from holding office and forced to cede the chair to minister O. Panneerselvam. Upon her acquittal six months later, Jayalalithaa returned as chief minister to complete her term. Noted for its ruthlessness to political opponents, many of whom were arrested in midnight raids, her government grew unpopular. Another period (2006–11) in the opposition followed, before Jayalalithaa was sworn in as chief minister for the fourth time after the AIADMK swept the 2011 assembly election. Her government received attention for its extensive social-welfare agenda, which included several subsidised -branded goods such as canteens, bottled water, salt and cement. Three years into her tenure, she was convicted in a disproportionate-assets case, rendering her disqualified to hold office. She returned as chief minister after being acquitted in May 2015. In the 2016 assembly election, she became the first Tamil Nadu chief minister since M.G.R in 1984 to be voted back into office. That September, she fell severely ill and, following 75 days of hospitalisation, died on 5 December 2016 due to cardiac arrest and became the first female chief minister in India to die in office.

Jayalalithaa never married and had no children. On 29 May 2020, her nephew J. Deepak and niece Deepa Jayakumar were declared as her legal heirs by Madras High Court.

Early life, education and family 
Jayalalithaa was born on 24 February 1948 to Jayaram and Vedavalli (Sandhya) in a Tamil Brahmin Iyengar family at Melukote, Pandavapura taluk, Mandya district, then in Mysore State (now Karnataka). She was initially named Komalavalli after her grandmother. She had a brother named Jayakumar.

Her paternal grandfather, Narasimhan Rengachary, was in the service of the Mysore kingdom as a surgeon and served as the court physician to Maharaja Krishna Raja Wadiyar IV of Mysore. Her maternal grandfather, Rangasamy Iyengar, moved to Mysore from Srirangam to work with Hindustan Aeronautics Limited. He had one son and three daughters—Ambujavalli, Vedavalli, and Padmavalli. Vedavalli was married to Jayaram, son of Narasimhan Rengachary. The couple Jayaram-Vedvalli had two children: a son Jayakumar and a daughter, Jayalalitha. Her mother, her relatives and later co-stars and friends referred to her as Ammu.  The name Jayalalithaa was adopted at the age of one for the purpose of using the name in schools and colleges. It was derived from the names of two houses where she resided in Mysore. One was "Jaya Vilas" and the other "Lalitha Vilas".

She is from the same lineage of popular figures like K. T. Bhashyam (Former minister of Mysore State and Chairman of Mysore Legislative Council) and famous lawyer L. S. Raju who made significant contribution in the history of Mysore State (Now Karnataka).

Jayalalithaa's father, Jayaram, was a lawyer but never worked and squandered most of the family's wealth. He died when Jayalalithaa was two years old. The widowed Vedavalli returned to her father's home in Bangalore in 1950. Vedavalli learnt shorthand and typewriting to take up a clerical position to help support the family in 1950. Her younger sister Ambujavalli had moved to Madras, working as an air hostess. She also started acting in drama and films using the screen name Vidyavathy. On the insistence of Ambujavalli, Jayalalithaa's mother Vedavalli also relocated to Madras and stayed with her sister from 1952. Vedavalli worked in a commercial firm in Madras and began dabbling in acting from 1953 under the screen name Sandhya. Jayalalithaa remained under the care of her mother's sister Padmavalli and maternal grandparents from 1950 to 1958 in Mysore. While still in Bangalore, Jayalalithaa attended Bishop Cotton Girls' School, Bangalore. In later interviews, Jayalalithaa spoke emotionally about how she missed her mother growing up in a different city. She had the opportunity to visit her mother during the summer holidays.

After her aunt Padmavalli's marriage in 1958, Jayalalithaa moved to Madras and began to live with her mother. She completed her education at Sacred Heart Matriculation School (popularly known as Church Park Presentation Convent or Presentation Church Park Convent).

She excelled at school and was offered a government scholarship to pursue further education. She won Gold State Award for coming first in 10th standard in the state of Tamil Nadu. She joined Stella Maris College, Chennai; however, discontinued her studies due to pressure from her mother and became a film actress.

The Poes Garden plot was bought by Jayalalithaa and her mother on 1 July 1967 at a cost of ₹ 1.32 lakh, measuring around 24,000 sq. feet (10 grounds) with a built-up area of 21,662 sq. feet. Jayalalithaa's mother Sandhya died in November 1971 at the age of 47. Jayalalithaa herself held the house warming ceremony of her residence Veda Nilayam (named after her beloved mother Vedavalli alias Sandhya) on 15 May 1972, early in the morning, followed by dinner and a Veena recital by classical musician Chitti babu in the evening. Her brother's wedding took place at her Veda Nilayam home in Poes Garden in 1972. Her brother Jayakumar, his wife Vijayalakshmi and their daughter Deepa Jayakumar lived in Poes Garden with Jayalalithaa till 1978 and then moved to T.Nagar Madras at the bungalow 'Sandhya Illam' which was bought by mother of Jayalalithaa. Her brother was unhappy with adoption of Sudhakaran, a relative of Sasikala, as foster son of Jayalalithaa. Jayalalithaa had adopted Sasikala's nephew Sudhakaran in 1995 and disowned him in 1996. Her brother died in 1995 of heart attack.

She was fluent in several languages, including Tamil, Telugu, Kannada, Hindi, Malayalam and English. She spoke with actress Saroja Devi in Kannada regularly as they were close friends and would talk to each other only in Kannada. She often conversed with Karnataka Chief ministers in Kannada. Basavaraj Bommai, the former irrigation minister and present chief minister of Karnataka said, "I was astonished by her Kannada slang and fluency."

She was fond of having dogs as her pets. But after the death of Julie, a spitz, in 1998 she could not bear the loss and hence discontinued keeping pet dogs at her home.

Film career

Early career 

In Madras (now Chennai), Jayalalithaa was trained in Carnatic music, western classical piano and various forms of classical dance, including Bharatanatyam, Kuchipudi, Mohiniyattam, Manipuri, Kathak. She learnt Bharatnatyam and dance forms under K.J.Sarasa. She had also learnt Kuchipudi under Padma Bhushan Guru Dr. Vempati Chinna Satyam. She became an accomplished dancer and gave her debut dance performance at the Rasika Ranjani Sabha in Mylapore in May 1960. The Chief Guest at the Arangetram was Shivaji Ganesan, who called her a "" (golden statue) and expressed wish that Jayalalithaa becomes a film star in future.

While a child, Jayalalithaa acted in the Kannada-language film Sri Shaila Mahathme (1961), which starred Rajkumar and Krishna Kumari. She had been taken to the studio by her mother as she was shooting in the same premises for a different film. While Jayalalithaa was watching the shooting, a problem arose as the child actress playing the Goddess Parvathy in a school drama scene in the film failed to show up and the producer Neerlahalli Thalikerappa and director Aroor Pattabhi asked Sandhya if Jayalalithaa could be asked to act in the dance sequence. Sandhya agreed and Jayalalithaa was swiftly dressed up as Parvathy and the scene was shot in Sri Shaila Mahatme.

She played Lord Krishna in a three-minute dance sequence held on stage in the Hindi film Man-Mauji (1962) and danced with Kumari Naaz who played Radha. Y. G. Parthasarathy ran the drama troupe United Amateur Artistes (UAA), which staged English and Tamil plays. Soon Jayalalithaa while a schoolgirl began acting in some plays of Parthasarathy along with her mother and aunt. She acted in small roles in plays such as Tea House of the August Moon and Undersecretary between 1960 and 1964.

Shankar Giri, the son of the former Indian President V. V. Giri, saw her small role in the English play Tea Houses of August Moon and was impressed. Shankar Giri approached her mother Sandhya and told he wanted to cast her daughter in an English film called The Epistle. Sandhya reluctantly agreed with the condition that shooting should be held only during weekends or school holidays.

Sandhya had acted in the 1964 Tamil film Karnan, produced and directed by Kannada film-maker B. R. Panthulu. Jayalalithaa accompanied her mother to a party related to the film and was spotted by Panthulu, who then decided to cast her opposite Kalyan Kumar in the Kannada movie Chinnada Gombe. He promised to finish all shooting within two months in order not to interfere with her education. Since Jayalalithaa would be studying for her PUC in two months' time, Sandhya had declined the offer initially. Sandhya agreed when that promise was made and Jayalalithaa started acting and she was paid . Panthulu kept his promise and completed shooting in six weeks. Jayalalithaa had forgotten all about films after acting in her Kannada debut film and had got ready to attend classes at Stella Maris as she had the ambition to be a lawyer. But the Kannada debut film became a blockbuster in 1964 and she became a well-known face.

Meanwhile, Jayalalithaa continued acting in Parthasarathy's plays. She played the leading role in plays such as Malathi, The Whole Truth, and the dance drama Kaveri Thanda Kalaiselvi between 1960 and 1966. She made her debut as the lead actress in Kannada films while still in school, age 15, in Chinnada Gombe (1964). She also appeared in a dance sequence of a song named "Malligeya Hoovinantha" in the movie Amarashilpi Jakanachari (1964).

She made her debut in Tamil theatre in April 1964, when she played a sales girl in the drama named Undersecretary. Parthasarathy and Sandhya were the lead characters, while Jayalalitha and Cho Ramaswamy were paired together and A. R. Srinivasan was also involved. The play was based on the lives of middle aged couple and Jayalaithaa played character of sales girl in the drama. Her performance caused Parthasarathy to make her lead heroine in a drama named Malathy. Meanwhile, the films she had shot during her vacation in April–May 1964—Chinnada Gombe and Manushulu Mamathalu—became blockbusters. By end of 1965, she had become popular among film producers and directors. She was approached by C. V. Sridhar for her Tamil film debut as well. Between 1964 and 1966 she did around 35 shows of drama named Malathy and later discontinued as she became very busy in films. It was during the year 1964, financial debts had increased of Sandhya and she suggested her daughter make use of the increasing film offers to come her way.

Jayalalithaa's debut in Tamil cinema was the leading role in Vennira Aadai (1965), directed by C. V. Sridhar. She made her debut in Telugu films as lead actress in Manushulu Mamathalu opposite Akkineni Nageswara Rao. Her last Telugu release was also opposite Akkineni Nageswara Rao in the film Nayakudu Vinayakudu, which was released in 1980. She was the first heroine to appear in skirts in Tamil films. She acted in one Hindi film called Izzat, with Dharmendra as her male costar in 1968. She starred in 28 box-office hit films with M.G. Ramachandran between 1965 and 1973. The first with M.G.R. was B.R. Panthalu's Aayirathil Oruvan in 1965 and their last film together was Pattikaattu Ponnaiya in 1973.

Jayalalithaa donated gold jewelleries she had to the then Indian Prime Minister Lal Bahadur Shastri during the Indo-Pakistani War of 1965.

She had 11 successful releases in Tamil in 1966. In the opening credits of Arasa Kattalai, for the first time her name was affixed with the phrase "".

Sandow M. M. A. Chinnappa Thevar was on the lookout for a regular heroine for his production after he had fight with the actress Savitri after the release of Vetaikkaran, and he signed Jayalalithaa on in 1965. She became a regular heroine for production house Devar films from 1966.

Jaishankar was romantically paired with Jayalalithaa in eight Tamil films including Muthu Chippi, Yaar Nee?, Nee!, Vairam, Vandhale Magarasi, Bommalattam (1968), Raja Veetu Pillai and Avalukku Aayiram Kangal, whereas the films Thanga Gopuram and Gowri Kalyanam had him play elder brother to her.

Jayalalithaa acted in twelve films as heroine opposite N. T. Rama Rao, in Telugu—Gopaludu Bhoopaludu (1967), Chikkadu Dorakadu (1967), Tikka Sankaraiah (1968), Niluvu Dopidi (1968), Baghdad Gaja Donga (1968), Kathanayakudu (1969), Kadaladu Vadaladu (1969), Gandikota Rahasyam (1969), Ali Baba 40 Dongalu (1970), Sri Krishna Vijayamu (1970), Sri Krishna Satya (1972), and Devudu Chesina Manushulu (1973). Jayalalitha had eight films with Akkineni Nageswara Rao in Telugu—Manushulu Mamathalu (1965), Aastiparulu (1966), Brahmachari (1968), Aadarsa Kutumbam (1969), Adrushtavanthulu (1969), Bharya Biddalu (1972), Premalu Pellillu (1974) and Nayakudu Vinayakudu (1980).

She also made a guest appearance in Telugu film Navarthi (1966). Her films in Telugu also included two with Krishna and one each with Sobhan Babu, Jaggayya, Ramakrishna and Haranath. She was given on-screen credit as Kalai Selvi in most of her Tamil films since 1967.

Later career 

Between 1965 and 1973, Jayalalithaa starred opposite M. G. Ramachandran in a number of successful films, including Aayirathil Oruvan, Kavalkaran, Adimai Penn, Engal Thangam, Kudiyirundha Koyil, Ragasiya Police 115 and Nam Naadu. Cho Ramaswamy cast her in the lead role in his directorial venture Yarrukkum Vetkam Illai.

She acted with Ravichandran in ten films—Gowri Kalyanam (1966), Kumari Penn (1966), Naan (1967), Magarasi (1967), Maadi Veettu Mappilai (1967), Panakkara Pillai (1968), Moondru Yezhuthu (1968), Andru Kanda Mugam (1968), Avalukku Aayiram Kangal and Baghdad Perazhagi (1974). In 1972, she acted opposite Sivaji Ganesan in Pattikada Pattanama, which went on to win the National Film Award for Best Feature Film in Tamil in 1973.

In 1973, she acted in Sri Krishna Satya, which won her the Filmfare Award for Best Actress in Telugu. Her other films with Sivaji Ganesan include Galatta Kalyanam and Deiva Magan; the latter holds the distinction of being the first Tamil film to be submitted by India for an Academy Award for Best Foreign Language Film.

Jayalalithaa was paired opposite Sivaji Ganesan in 17 films. She acted in six films with R. Muthuraman as a romantic leading pair—Dhikku Theriyadha Kaattil, Thirumangalyam, Kanavan Manaivi, Avandhan Manidhan, Suryagandhi, Anbu Thangai and Muthuraman played supporting roles in Kannan En Kadhalan, Major Chandrakanth, Naan, En Annan, Adi Parashakti, Thaer Thiruvizha, Dharmam Engey, Chitra Pournami and Oru Thaai Makkal. She made her debut in Malayalam with Jesus (1973). Her 100th film was Thirumangalyam (1974), directed by A. Vincent.

She was romantically paired opposite Sivakumar in Kandan Karunai and Sri Krishna Leela. Sivakumar played supporting roles in Shakti Leelai, Yarrukum Vetkam Ilali, Thirumangalyam, Annaivelakanni, Kavalkaran, Motoram Sunderapillai and Ganga Gowri.

In 1972, Jayalalithaa was invited to perform with her dance troupe in Mysore for the Dussehra exhibition. Due to her busy shooting schedule and health reasons, Jayalalithaa had to cancel the performance at the last minute. Vatal Nagaraj's Karnataka-based political outfit condemned her for cancelling her dance performance in spite of being a Kannadiga girl. Jayalalithaa responded by issuing a statement contradicting him in an interview to Vikatan magazine that she was a Tamilian and not a Kannadiga. Jayalalithaa was at Premier studio in Mysuru for the shooting of the B. R. Panthulu's film Ganga Gowri. The group of Kannada activists from Vatal Nagaraj's outfit got to know of this and invaded the studio premises. The mob surrounded Jayalalithaa and demanded that she withdraw her statement of being a Tamil woman. Jayalalithaa was defiant even when mob had encircled her. “I am a Tamil girl, not a Kannada girl,” Jayalalithaa responded loudly in Tamil, refusing to bow even as protestors gathered around her.

The heroes of her films never objected to the title of the film being conferred on the female lead played by Jayalalithaa. Adimai Penn, Kanni Thaai, and Kannan En Kadhalan had Ramachandran as the lead male hero but the story and the title was built around the character played by Jayalalithaa. Similarly, Engerindo Vandhaal, Sumathi En Sundari, Paadhukaappu and Anbai Thedi had Sivaji Ganeshan as the male lead but the title and the story was built around her character. She did many female-centric films where the story revolved on her character, such as Vennira Adai, Yaar Nee?, Kumari Penn, Nee, Gowri Kalyanam, Magaraasi, Muthu Chippi, Thanga Gopuram, Avalukku Ayiram Kangal, Annamitta Kai, Vandhaale Magaraasi, Suryagandhi, Thirumangalyam, Yarukkum Vetkam Illai, and Kanavan Manaivi.

She received the title "" from then Chief Minister Karunanidhi and also won Tamil Nadu Cinema Fan Award for Best Actress for her 100th film Thirumangalyam in 1974. Her last film in Tamil was Nadhiyai Thedi Vandha Kadal (1980). Her last film as the heroine was Nayakudu Vinayakudu in Telugu, which became the highest grosser of the year in Telugu.

Her successful Kannada films include Badukuva Daari (1966), Mavana Magalu (1965), Nanna Kartavya (1965), Chinnada Gombe (1964) and Mane Aliya (1964). Jayalalithaa holds the record for having been the Tamil actress with maximum silver jubilee hits in her career—85 hits of 92 Tamil films as main female lead heroine and she also has all 28 films in Telugu as silver jubilee hits. She was the highest-paid Indian actress from 1965 to 1980. She made guest appearances in nine films and six of her films were dubbed into Hindi. She had 119 box office hits between 1961 and 1980, of the total 125 films she did as the main female lead. She made a brief appearance in 1992's Neenga Nalla Irukkanum.

She acted in mythological films like Kandan Karunai, Aadhi Parashakti, Shri Krishna Satya, Shri Krishna Vijayam, Shri Rama Katha, Shri Krishna Leela, Shakti Leelai, Ganga Gowri, Annai Velankanni and Jesus. Her period dramas include Ayirathil Oruvan, Neerum Neruppum, Mani Magudam, Adimai Penn, Ali Baba 40 Dongalu, Arasa Katalai, and Baghdad Perazhagi.

She acquired the reputation of being a multi-faceted actor equally comfortable in fantasy and mythological genres as well as in modern social dramas and hence in 1969, in Tamil Conference, she was given the tag of "Kaveri Thandha Kalai Selvi".

She, Savitri and Saroja Devi have been cited as the first female superstars of Tamil cinema. She did double roles in eight films.

She received Special Award from Filmfare for her performances in 'Chandhrodhayam', 'Adimai Penn' and 'Engirundho Vandhaal' in the years 1966, 1969 and 1970 as the Filmfare Award for Best Actress was introduced only in 1972. Her performance in Pattikada Pattanama, Suryagandhi were critically acclaimed and won her consecutive Filmfare Award for Best Actress in 1972 and 1973, respectively.

From 1968 to 1973, at the peak of her career she took interviews and wrote columns in the magazines like Bommai. She wrote a column-"Ennangal Sila" in magazine Thuglak in the 1970s. She also wrote a short story, "Oravin Kaidhigal", for the magazine Kalki, "Manadhai Thotta Malargal" for Thaai magazine in the early 1980s. She wrote about her own life in a serialised memoir in the Tamil weekly magazine Kumudam.

In 1980, she decided to voluntarily decline any new film offers. An Australia-based journalist Brian Laul took over the mantle of Piousji ('Khaas Bhat'- The filmi gossip column) wrote an article specifying Jayalalithaa was trying for a comeback but was not being offered any roles. Jayalalithaa chose to respond to him by writing a letter, in which she mentioned that she was not struggling to make any comeback and that she turned down the offer from producer Balaji to star in Billa (1980) alongside Rajinikanth. She added she wanted to pursue other interests and was not interested in pursuing her film career any further.

Her closest friends from film industry included Manorama, Cho Ramaswamy, Rajasree, Jamuna, Saroja Devi, Kumari Sachu, Anjali Devi, Sowcar Janaki, Sukumari, Ravichandran, R. Muthuraman, Nagesh, M. N. Nambiar, Vennira Aadai Nirmala, S. A. Asokan, Jaishankar, V. K. Ramasamy, Major Sundarrajan, P. Susheela, Sheela, M. S. Viswanathan, L. R. Eswari, R.S.Manohar.

She quoted on M. G. Ramachandran, "He was a very warm and caring kind of a person. And after Mother died, he replaced her in my life. He was everything to me. He was mother, father, brother, friend, philosopher, guide. Everything. He sort of took over my life." In many of her interviews she often said she entered films on being asked by her mother and entered politics on request by M. G. Ramachandran.

Political career

Early political career 

Jayalalithaa denied claims that M.G.R., who had been chief minister for the state since 1977, was instrumental in introducing her to politics. On 4 June 1982, she joined the AIADMK, which was founded by M.G.R. Her maiden public speech,"" (The Greatness of a Woman), was delivered at the AIADMK's political conference in the same year at Cuddalore and was well received. Even the then Prime Minister Indira Gandhi and the Rajya Sabha member Khushwant Singh came to witness her speech which was widely acclaimed for its clarity of diction and elegant prose. Her seat number in Rajya Sabha was 185, which was coincidentally the same as that of what C. N. Annadurai had while he was a member in the Rajya Sabha. On 28 January 1983, she became propaganda secretary for the party and campaigned extensively for the party candidate R. Amirtharaj in the by-election for the Tiruchendur Assembly constituency in February that year.

M.G.R. wanted her to be a member of the Rajya Sabha because of her fluency in English.She defeated Arcot N. Veeraswami, who is the senior DMK leader in 1984 Rajya Sabha elections. Indira Gandhi lauded Jayalalithaa for the various speeches she made on issues including the one on internal security in Rajya Sabha. Jayalalithaa was elected to that body in 1984 and retained her seat until 1989. Jayalalithaa was one of the 16 special guests who were invited to participate the state dinner hosted by then Indian Prime Minister Indira Gandhi in honor of Erstwhile Yugoslavian President Veselin Djuranovic at Rashtrapati Bhavan. Her success in her role as propaganda secretary caused resentment among high-ranking members of the party. By engineering a rift between her and M.G.R., these members influenced M.G.R. to stop her writing about her personal life in a Tamil magazine. Despite these machinations, she remained admired by the rank and file of the party. She was given key responsibilities, including in the implementation of the landmark noon-meals scheme when M. G. Ramachandran was the chief minister and this taught her lessons in welfare politics. Later when M.G.R. fell ill, she campaigned extensively for the party before the 1984 Tamil Nadu Legislative Assembly election.

In 1984, when M.G.R. was incapacitated due to a stroke, Jayalalithaa was said to have attempted to take over the position of chief minister or the party on the pretext that his health would prevent him from the proper execution of his duties. She successfully led the campaign in the 1984 general elections, in which the AIADMK allied with the Congress.  On the midnight of 31 December 1984, When MGR was in United States, Jayalalithaa was unceremoniously turned out of Tamil Nadu House, which was her official residence as a Rajya Sabha M.P. by the coterie against her.  Following his death in 1987, the AIADMK split into two factions: one supported his widow, Janaki Ramachandran This faction was called AIADMK (JA) and the other favoured Jayalalithaa called AIADMK (J). Jayalalithaa faction was supported by senior leaders like V. R. Nedunchezhiyan, Aranganayagam, KKSSR Ramachandran, Thirunavukarasar. Janaki was selected as the Chief Minister on 7 January 1988 with the support of 96 members; due in part to irregularities by speaker P. H. Pandian, who dismissed six members to ease her victory, she won a motion of confidence in the house. However, Rajiv Gandhi used Article 356 of the Constitution of India to dismiss the Janaki-led government and impose president's rule on the state.

At the age of 41, Jayalalithaa entered the Assembly successfully contesting the subsequent 1989 elections on the basis of being M.G.R.'s political heir.

Leader of the Opposition, 1989 
She was elected to the Tamil Nadu Legislative Assembly in 1989 as a representative of the Bodinayakkanur constituency. This election saw the Jayalalithaa-led faction of the AIADMK win 27 seats and Jayalalithaa became the first woman to be elected Leader of the Opposition in Tamil Nadu Legislative Assembly. She is the first Indian actress and first woman to become an opposition leader in India. On 9 February 1989, the two factions of AIADMK merged and they unanimously accepted Jayalalithaa as the general secretary of the party and the "Two leaves" symbol of the party was restored.

On 25 March 1989, as claimed by the party and a section of the members present in the assembly, amidst heavy violence inside the house among the ruling DMK party members and the opposition, Jayalalithaa was  attacked by the ruling DMK members in front of the assembly speaker M. Tamilkudimagan when violence broke out between DMK and AIADMK MLA's after she called Karunanidhi a criminal and when he named and shamed her. Karunanidhi fell on the floor when one of her MLAs rushed towards him.Both Karunanidhi and Jayalaithaa alleged of attacks against them. Jayalalitha left the Assembly with her torn saree drawing a parallel with the shameful disrobing of Draupadi in the epic Mahabharata. At the peak of the situation, Jayalalithaa was about to leave the house, she vowed to not enter the house "until as a Chief Minister". In spite of some sections of media terming it as a theatrics, it received a lot of media coverage and sympathy from the public. During the 1989 general elections, the AIADMK allied with the Congress party and was handed a significant victory. The AIADMK, under her leadership, also won the by-elections in Marungapuri, Madurai East and Peranamallur assembly constituencies.

First term as Chief Minister, 1991 

In 1991, following the assassination of Rajiv Gandhi days before the elections, her alliance with the Indian National Congress enabled her to ride the wave of sympathy that gave the coalition victory. The AIADMK alliance with the Congress won 225 out of the 234 seats contested and won all 39 constituencies in the centre. Re-elected to the assembly, she became the state's youngest chief minister, and the first woman to serve a full term, serving from 24 June 1991 to 12 May 1996. In 1992, her government introduced the "Cradle Baby Scheme". At that time the ratio of male to female in some parts of Tamil Nadu was skewed by the practice of female infanticide and the abortion of female foetuses. The government established centres in some areas, these being equipped to receive and place into adoption unwanted female babies. The scheme was extended in 2011. Her party had 226 elected members to the assembly. Her government was the first to introduce police stations operated solely by women. She introduced 30% quota for women in all police jobs and established as many as 57 all-women police stations. There were other all-women establishments like libraries, stores, banks and co-operative elections. She began to be referred as Thanga Gopuram, Thanga Silai ('Golden  Statue') by her followers.

In July 1993, she observed fast for 80 hours (four days) near the MGR Memorial on the Marina beach, demanding that Karnataka release Kaveri water for the kuruvai crop. She ended her fast only after Prime Minister P.V. Narasimha Rao sent his Cabinet colleague and Union Water Resources Minister V.C. Shukla to Chennai to assure her that the centre would set up two committees to ensure implementation of the 1991-interim award of the Tribunal.

Reservations

In  1992, The Supreme Court Verdict which ruled that the overall amount of reservations allowed should not exceed 50% as per Article 16(4) endangered the 69 Percent Reservation in Tamil Nadu.

In 1993, the Tamil Nadu Backward Classes, Scheduled Castes, and Scheduled Tribes Bill, 1993 was passed by the Assembly (Act 45 of 1994). The Bill was sent to the President Shankar Dayal Sharma for his approval. J Jayalalithaa's  AIADMK government led a cross-party committee of Tamil Nadu politicians to Delhi to meet with the Prime Minister Narasimha Rao led Central government and stepped up pressure on the centre to bring in a Constitutional amendment to include the Tamil Nadu Act in the Ninth Schedule, ensuring that its validity cannot be challenged in any court. By the end of August 1994, the Act became a part of the Ninth Schedule by the presidential accent, confirming "the 69 percent reservation" exclusive for Tamil Nadu. The development fetched her the title of "" (The leader who upheld Social justice) by K. Veeramani, General Secretary of Dravidar Kazhagam.

On 20 January 1994, Mother Teresa Called on Chief Minister Jayalalithaa at her poes garden residence in chennai and lauded her welfare projects for girls, destitute women and the aged. Mother Teresa reportedly said that she and Jayalalithaa, India's then only female chief minister, were "working for and fulfilling the same noble cause". Mother Teresa said she would pray daily for Jayalalithaa, whose projects included the Cradle Baby Scheme (CBS) Mother Teresa was also present at the State function on the International Women's Day On 9 March 1994 at Madras which Jayalalithaa later recalled as  "memorable event in my life".

She first invited Ford Motor Company to establish business in Tamil Nadu in 1995. This was followed by numerous companies setting up factories here especially from automobiles sector which included Hyundai Motor, BMW, Daimler, Renault, Nissan, Mitsubishi, Wright and Yamaha. Due to this, Madras (now Chennai) began to be called as the Detroit of India under her first term. Royal Enfield made significant expansion in Tamil Nadu and apart from Ashok Leyland, TAFE and TVS Motors became key players in Tamil Nadu.

Loss of power, 1996 
The Jayalalithaa-led AIADMK lost power in the 1996 elections, when it won 4 of the 168 seats that they contested. Jayalalithaa was herself defeated by the DMK candidate in Bargur constituency. The outcome has been attributed to an anti-incumbency sentiment and several allegations of corruption and malfeasance against her and her ministers. The wedding event of her foster son Sudhakaran, who married a granddaughter of the Tamil film actor Shivaji Ganesan, was held on 7 September 1995 at Madras and was viewed on large screens by over 150,000 people. The event holds two Guinness World Records: one is for the most guests at a wedding and the other is for being the largest wedding banquet. Subsequently, in November 2011, Jayalalithaa told a special court than the entire  expenses associated with the wedding were paid by the family of the bride.

Her fortunes revived in the 1998 general election, as the AIADMK became a key component of then Indian Prime Minister Atal Bihari Vajpayee's 1998–99 government; her withdrawal of support toppled it and triggered another general election just a year later.

There were several corruption cases filed against her by the ruling DMK government headed by Karunanidhi. The investigation alleged that the amount through the TV dealers were routed in the form of cheques to a relative of Sasikala, who had quoted Jayalalithaa's residence as hers. She earlier filed an anticipatory bail in the trial court, which was rejected on 7 December 1996. She was acquitted in the case on 30 May 2000 by the trial court and the High Court upheld the order of the lower court.

Though Sudhakaran was adopted by Jayalalithaa as her foster son in 1995, when she became aware that Sudhakaran began to interfere in her financial affairs and that he took money without intending to repay, she disowned him in 1996 within one year of adoption.

When questioned on her views on Sasikala, Jayalalithaa quoted in 1996 "Sasikala never functioned as extra constitutional power centre. Calling her de facto chief minister is nonsense. She is not interested in politics and I have no intention to bring her into politics." It annoyed her when people said Sasikala was behind many of her political decisions and termed such news as rubbish and insult to her position as chief minister.

Second term as Chief Minister, 2001 

Jayalalithaa was barred from standing as a candidate in the 2001 elections because she was found guilty of criminal offences, including allegedly obtaining property belonging to a state-operated agency called TANSI. Although she appealed to the Supreme Court of India, having been sentenced to five years' imprisonment, the matter was not resolved at the time of the elections. Despite this, the AIADMK won a majority and she was installed as Chief Minister as a non-elected member of the state assembly on 14 May 2001. She was also convicted in Pleasant Stay hotel case on 3 February 2000 by a trial court to one-year imprisonment. Jayalalithaa was acquitted in both the TANSI and Pleasant Stay Hotel cases on 4 December 2001 and the Supreme Court upheld the order of the High Court on 24 November 2003.

The AIADMK returned to power in 2001, although Jayalalithaa was personally disbarred from contesting due to the corruption cases. Within a few months of her taking oath as chief minister, in September 2001, she was disqualified from holding office, and forced to cede the chair to aide O. Panneerselvam.

Third term as Chief Minister, 2002 

Upon her acquittal six months later, Jayalalithaa returned as chief minister to complete her term. Noted for its ruthlessness to political opponents, many of whom were arrested in midnight raids, her government grew unpopular. Her appointment was legally voided in September 2001 when the Supreme Court ruled that she could not hold it whilst convicted of criminal acts. O. Panneerselvam, a minister in her party, was subsequently installed as the Chief Minister. However, his government was purported to have been puppeted and micro-managed by Jayalalithaa.

Subsequently, in March 2002, Jayalalithaa assumed the position of Chief Minister once more, having been acquitted of some charges by the Madras High Court. This cleared the way for her to contest a mid-term poll to the Andipatti constituency, after the sitting MLA(Member of the Legislative Assembly) for the seat, gave up his membership, which she won by a handsome margin.

India's first company of female police commandos was set up in Tamil Nadu in 2003. They underwent the same training as their male counterparts, covering the handling of weapons, detection and disposal of bombs, driving, horseriding, and adventure sports. The government led by her in 2003 banned sale of all lotteries, including online, within the territory of the state, despite the risk of the state losing revenue. She gave orders to a special task force headed by K. Vijaykumar to conduct a secret operation to capture and kill the bandit Veerappan by entering Karnataka. In 2004 she declared eliminating Veerappan as biggest achievement of her government and quoted ""My only brief to them was capture Veerappan dead or alive. After that I never interfered. I left them to work out their own strategies and this paid off." She began to be referred as 'People's CM' (Makallin Mudhalvar) and Iron Lady of India by end of this term. In this term she launched Rainwater Harvesting (RWH) scheme in 2001 to rejuvenate water sources and this improved ground water levels in the parched southern state and this idea was replicated by various states and even by the centre. She also started the Veeranam project to deliver water to the dry metropolis of Chennai. Doctor Manmohan Singh frequently praised Jayalalithaa for her administrative skills, mid-day meal schemes and efforts for gender empowerment.

Her administrative abilities were notable in her handling of events following the tsunami that hit Tamil Nadu on 26 December 2004. Jayalalithaa announced a Rs 153.37 crore relief package, divided into a general package and a separate one for fishermen. She announced that affected families would get Rs 1 lakh as compensation for every member lost, along with one dhoti, one sari, two bedsheets, 60 kg of rice, three litres of kerosene, and Rs 1,000 in cash for groceries and that furthermore, Rs 1,000 was to be given for purchase of utensils, Rs 2,000 so they could put up accommodation. Per family, and there were about one lakh families in all, the package would cost about Rs 5,000. The fishermen also received an extra Rs 65 crore meant to cover gill nets and boats. It was only a matter of hours before Nagapattinam had its power supply back. With the state working on disaster management for over seven years, response time had been reduced significantly; mobile cranes and ambulances were on patrol. The government entrusted district administration with rehabilitation of affected families, and when they were found to be incompetent, she reshuffled or sacked officers immediately. Jayalalithaa even extended help to the Sri Lankan government by instating officers to guide the island nation in the process of rehabilitation. Her administrative style was uncompromising, whether it was banning the sale of gutkha, or mandatory installation of rainwater harvesting systems, but, she got things done on time without any ifs or buts, as was seen with the tsunami relief, ensuring people remembered not the ruthlessness of her tenure, but the help it gave them.

On 11 May 2006, Jayalalithaa resigned as the chief minister of Tamil Nadu following her party's defeat in the assembly elections.

Leader of the Opposition, 2006 
AIADMK fared poorly in May 2006 Tamil Nadu Legislative Assembly election, with Her party winning just 61 seats out of total 234 in the state elections in 2006. She won in Andipatti. Though her main opposition, DMK did not win a single party majority (96/234), DMK coalition had 162/234 seats and formed the cabinet until 2011 which she referred to as "Minority DMK government".

On 29 May 2006, Jayalalithaa was unanimously elected as Leader of the Opposition by AIADMK MLAs replacing O. Panneerselvam soon after two days, she single-handedly took on the ruling DMK in the house in the wake of the suspension of all 60 AIADMK legislators for the entire session.

Sri Lankan Tamil Issue

In August 2008, Jayalalithaa moved the Supreme Court to nullify the Katchatheevu agreements of 1974 and 1976. She had raised the retrieval of the islet in her maiden Independence Day address in August 1991. In 1991, Jayalalithaa led Tamil Nadu Assembly adopted a resolution demanding the retrieval of Katchatheevu. During the civil war and with northern borders under the control of the LTTE, the fishermen had easy access into the fishing grounds.

Jayalalithaa undertook a day-long fast in March 2009, a couple of months before the Parliamentary elections demanding an immediate ceasefire. She accused then Chief Minister Karunanidhi led DMK government in the State and the UPA government at the Centre of "criminal neglect in failing to provide relief and succour to the Sri Lankan Tamils".

In April 2009, LTTE Chief Prabhakaran thanked Jayalalithaa for voicing her support in favour of Tamil Eelam through a secret letter. It was later revealed by AIADMK MP Maitreyan.

After she returned to power in May 2011, the Assembly had adopted several resolutions, seeking an international probe into the alleged war crimes and genocide in the final phase of the Sri Lankan Civil War. She also demanded an economic embargo on Sri Lanka. She expressed her opposition not only to the presence of Sri Lankan military personnel receiving training anywhere in India but also to that of Sri Lankan sportspersons.

As for Sri Lankan Tamil refugees living in Tamil Nadu, she had changed her position. Originally, she justified the refugees taking shelter in the State "as long as the genocide continues" in the Sri Lanka. But, after the Assassination of Rajiv Gandhi in 1991, she had branded the refugee camps as "breeding grounds" for LTTE militants. However, she turned sympathetic again to the refugees in 2011. She not only enhanced allowance for them but also announced a special scheme for building "durable houses" for rehabilitation.

Fourth term as Chief Minister, 2011 

After another period (2006–11) in the opposition, Jayalalithaa was sworn in as chief minister for the fourth time after the AIADMK swept the 2011 assembly election in a landslide and stromed back to power. She won in Srirangam. Her government received attention for its extensive social-welfare agenda, which included several subsidised "Amma"-branded goods such as (Amma canteens, Amma bottled water, Amma salt, Amma medical shops, Amma cement and Amma baby care kit).

In April 2011, the AIADMK was part of a 13-party alliance that won the 14th state assembly elections. Jayalalithaa was sworn in as the chief minister of Tamil Nadu for the fourth time on 16 May 2011, having been elected unanimously as the leader of the AIADMK party subsequent to those elections.

On 19 December 2011, Jayalalithaa expelled her long-time close friend V. K. Sasikala and 13 others from the AIADMK after she became aware that Sasikala and her family were working against her. Most of the party members welcomed her decision. The matter was resolved by 31 March when Sasikala was reinstated as a party member after issuing a written apology. Sasikala in her written apology mentioned that she had no ambitions either in the party or in the government and wanted to serve Jayalalithaa and added that she became aware of misdeeds done by her family members when Jayalalithaa was in power. Only after Sasikala promised to be not in touch with her family members, Jayalalithaa allowed Sasikala back to her house.

In this term, she announced the Pension Scheme for Destitute Transgender by which those above ages of 40 could get a monthly pension of Rs.1,000. Her government ensured members of the transgender community could enrol for education and job. Beginning from 2011, every year her government gave free laptops to students who clear tenth and twelfth standard to impart digital education to rural areas. Her government in 2011 decided to give four goats and a cow to each family below poverty line — mixer and grinders and fans for households, 3 sets of free uniforms, school, bags, notebooks, geometry boxes for all children in government schools, and cycles and laptops for Class 11 and 12 students. In 2011 she launched the marriage assistance scheme wherein the female students received 4 gram gold free for use as Thirumangalyam for their marriage and cash assistance up to Rs.50,000 for undergraduate or diploma holding females. There were rampant power cut issues between 2006 and 2011 while AIADMK was in opposition wherein for 10 to 15 hours there was no supply of electricity. However, after she regained power, between 2011 and 2015, her state government corrected all the discrepancies of previous DMK regime such that the Central Electricity Authority in 2016 said the state is expected to have 11,649 million units of surplus power. Tamil Nadu became among the power surplus states while she was chief minister in this term. In this term her government ensured the wrongfully usurped property by land grabbing during 2006 to 2011 in the previous DMK regime, had been retrieved and handed over to rightful owners between 2011 and 2015.

She announced in 2012, the Vision 2023 document which embodied a strategic plan for infrastructure development which included raising the per capita income of residents to $10,000 per annum, matching Human Development Index to that of developed countries by 2023, providing high-quality infrastructure all over the State, making Tamil Nadu the knowledge capital and innovation hub of India. This project had three components — Overall Vision Document, Compilation of Project Profile and Road Map. The work on this continued under her supervision until her death. She inaugurated 'Amma health insurance scheme' in 2012.

Amma Branded Schemes
In February 2013, Jayalalithaa Government inaugurated the state-run Subsidised food programme called Amma Unavagam (Amma Canteen), which was later praised by economist and Nobel laureate Amartya Sen in his book An Uncertain Glory – India and its Contradictions and inspired by many states in India. The Scheme was also lauded by Egypt in 2014. Under the scheme, municipal corporations of the state-run canteens serving subsidised food at low prices. which was followed by the plenty of populist schemes such as Amma Kudineer (bottled mineral water), 'Amma' Salt, 'Amma' Medical Shops, and 'Amma' Cement.

In 2015, she also launched 'Amma baby care kit' scheme where every mother who gave birth in the government hospital gets 16 types of products.

Verdicts on Tamil Nadu water rows

Jayalalithaa had initiated a case in the Supreme Court to uphold the state's rights on Mullaperiyar Dam issue In 2006. As a result, in May 2014, Supreme court verdict allowed the Tamil Nadu State to increase the storage level in the Mullaperiyar Dam to 142 feet from 136 ft and struck down the unconstitutional law enacted by the Kerala Government in 2006 restricting the storage level to 136 ft. This Supreme Court Verdict sustained the livelihood of the farmers and people in the southern districts of Tamil Nadu.

In February 2013, the Union Government notified the final award of Cauvery Water Disputes Tribunal (CWDT) on the directions of the Supreme Court. Then Chief Minister Jayalalithaa termed it as a "tremendous achievement" of her government after 22 long years of legal battle, the State had got Due justice. Then Jayalalithaa said that it was the happiest day of her life and the happiest day for the farmers in Tamil Nadu, she recalled her famous fast-unto-death at Marina beach in 1993.

General Secretary of AIADMK

On 29 August 2014, Jayalalithaa was re-elected as the General Secretary of the All India Anna Dravida Munnetra Kazhagam for the 7th Consecutive term, Making her the longest serving general secretary of the party till date. Earlier, She was elected in the years of 1988, 1989, 1993, 1998, 2003, 2008 and 2014.

Disproportionate assets case, 2014 

Three years into her tenure, she was convicted in a disproportionate-assets case, rendering her disqualified to hold office.

On 27 September 2014, Jayalalithaa was sentenced to four years in jail and fined  by the Special Court in Bengaluru. She was convicted in an 18-year-old disproportionate assets case that was launched by Janata Party President Subramanian Swamy (now a member of Bharatiya Janata Party) on 20 August 1996 on the basis of an Income Tax Department report on her. Jayalalithaa's close associate Sasikala, her niece Ilavarasi, her nephew and the chief minister's disowned foster son Sudhakaran were also convicted. They were sentenced to four years in jail and fined  each. The verdict was delivered by a makeshift court in the Parappana Agrahara prison complex in the presence of Jayalalithaa and the other accused.

She was automatically disqualified from the post of chief minister and the legislative assembly of Tamil Nadu, and thus became the first sitting Indian chief minister to be disqualified. O. Panneerselvam, a minister in her party, succeeded her as the Chief Minister on 29 September 2014. On 17 October 2014, the Supreme Court granted her two months' bail and suspended her sentence. On 18 October 2014, Jayalalithaa returned to Chennai after spending 21 days in Bangalore jail. Despite heavy rain that day, AIADMK cadres assembled outside her residence and welcomed her.

On 11 May 2015, a special Bench of the Karnataka High Court set aside her conviction on appeal. That court acquitted her and the alleged associates—Sasikala, her niece Ilavarasi, her nephew and Jayalalithaa's disowned foster son Sudhakaran.

On 14 February 2017 (subsequent to her death) the Supreme Court of India over-ruled the Karnataka High Court. Sasikala and the other accused were convicted and sentenced to four years of imprisonment, as well as being fined 10 crores each. The case against Jayalalithaa was abated because she had died and hence can't defend herself.

Fifth term as Chief Minister, 2015 

The acquittal allowed her once again to hold office and on 23 May 2015, Jayalalithaa was sworn in as Chief Minister of Tamil Nadu for the fifth time. She was subsequently re-elected by the electorate of the Radhakrishnan Nagar of North Chennai in the by-election held on 27 June 2015. In a landslide victory, she polled more than 88 per cent votes of the 74.4 per cent turnout, winning by a margin of over 150,000 votes.

In 2015, she introduced Amma Master Health checkup plan where in people could get various treatments done at a low fee in government hospitals and rolled out Amma Arogya plan wherein at primary health care centre in Tamil Nadu, certain tests can be done by public twice a week. This was done to help the sections of society who cannot afford the fares asked for by private hospital. Later in February 2016 she started the free bus ride scheme for senior citizens above age of 60 wherein person could travel free of cost for 10 times a month. Her government initiated Global Investors Summit in 2015 which saw over Rs 2.43 lakh crore worth of investments being committed to the state. Jayalalithaa's term, all of them together, saw some big-ticket investments in the state and over $20 billion FDI. The department of industrial policy and promotion data disclosed that Tamil Nadu saw foreign direct investment inflows of $7.3 billion from April 2000 to March 2011; however, this went up to $13.94 billion from April 2011 to December 2015, under her government, which at as per conversion rate  equals Rs 83,766 crore. Between April 2015 and December 2015, the State attracted $4.3 billion in FDI.

In June 2015, Pakistani news channels Samaa TV and Geo News aired a news and applauded Jayalalithaa for her government's scheme which was introduced in 2013, of supplying free rice to mosques during Ramzan and suggested the scheme should be implemented in Pakistan too.

Sixth consecutive term as Chief Minister, 2016 

In the 2016 assembly election, she became the first Tamil Nadu chief minister since M.G.R. in 1984 to be voted back into power. That September, she fell severely ill and, following 75 days of hospitalisation, died on 5 December 2016 due to cardiac arrest.

BJP President Amit Shah accused the Jayalalithaa government of being the "most corrupt" in the country and asked the people to oust it in the 16 May Assembly elections. On that Election, 
Jayalalithaa's Campaign Slogan was  "I'm of the people, and I'm for the people." Jayalalithaa was again elected as Chief Minister of Tamil Nadu in the May 2016 elections. She retained the Radhakrishnan Nagar Assembly constituency with a margin of 39,545 votes over her DMK rival. She became the first leader in Tamil Nadu to serve consecutive terms as Chief Minister since the death of M.G.R. in 1987. In her victory speech, she commented, "Even when 10 parties allied themselves against me, I did not have a coalition and I placed my faith in God and built an alliance with the people. It is clear that the people have faith in me and I have total faith in the people."

Her government within 100 days of resuming power in May 2016, wrote off the outstanding crop loans given by cooperative banks to over 16.94 lakh farmers, gave free power to households to extent of first 100 units and gave free power to handloom weavers to extent of 200 units, gave 750 units of power to power loom weavers, implemented closure of 500 liquor shops and reduction of working hours of liquor outlets emergence of power surplus states. The establishment of first 1,000 MW nuclear power plant at Kudankulam is also regarded as one of her achievements. She increased the freedom fighters monthly pension to Rs 12,000, family pension and increased special pension to Rs 6,000. On 21 September 2016 she inaugurated two Chennai Metro rail lines by way of video conferencing. This was her last public appearance before being admitted to hospital on 22 September 2016.

Controversies

Personality cult 
Followers of Jayalalithaa often worshiped her as a divine being. She stimulated a cult following, and adoring supporters often termed her "Adi Parashakti" (the eternal mighty goddess). Several experts say that over the years the cult called 'Amma' has been carefully crafted. Others claim that the emotional outburst is just a spontaneous display of loyalist support. C Lakshmanan of the Madras Development Institute studies, who has studied personality cult in the politics of Tamil Nadu, said posters were installed around the state portraying Jayalalithaa as a goddess back then. She was worshiped by the party cadre as "Amma" (Mother). She made sure the respect and loyalty of the functionaries of the party was there for everyone to see. The entire Cabinet would fall in line and bow in front of the helicopter in which it was flying. Members of the party, at all levels never found it difficult to prostrate before her in full view of the public. Many of her worshipping followers are known to profess their loyalty through acts such as walking on hot coals or drawing her portrait with their blood. S Kirubakaran who is a Journalist-turned-advocate, wrote a book on Jayalalitha titled, 'Ammavin Kathai,' said that when M.G.R. was a Chief Minister, he carefully chose MLAs and Ministers for the first time after going through their knowledge and experience. But Jayalalithaa had begun to assign those who praised her. Even after her death, the AIADMK leaders continued to prostrate themselves before her burial ground.

1999 Attempted murder case 
A case of murder attempt were registered against Jayalalithaa, her close associate Sasikala, and Sasikala's nephew V Mahadevan has been recorded by the Chennai police on following a complaint by former Jayalalithaa's auditor, Rajasekaran, who alleged that he was summoned to the Poes Garden bungalow and violently assaulted by Jayalalithaa, Sasikala and Mahadevan with a stick and high-heeled shoes. Rajasekaran also stated that he had been forced by Jayalalithaa and Sasikala to sign two letters and a promissory note in respect of ₹50 lakhs. Jayalalithaa, however, denied the charges in a statement.

Corruption cases

1996 colour TV case 

In the colour TV corruption case involving the purchase of TV sets to villagers, Jayalalithaa was charged and arrested. The TV sets were provided in the framework of a government education and entertainment plan for the village population. Officials said the TVs were purchased at inflated prices and claimed that some of the money paid for TV stations was returned as kickbacks to government officials. Later, she was acquitted as the accusation against them were not proven beyond doubt.

Detained in 1996, the media reported that 21.28 kg of gold jewels worth Rs 3.5 crore, 10,500 saris, 91 designer watches, 750 pairs of shoes, 1,250 kg of silver objects worth 3.12 crores, diamonds worth 2 crores, a silver sword and 19 vehicles were among the priceless treasures found at her house.

1995 Foster son and luxury wedding corruption 
In 1995, Jayalalithaa's friend Sasikala's nephew Sudhakaran was engaged to the youngest daughter of Sivaji Ganesan. Jayalalithaa was a chief minister of state by this time. Jaya declared that Sudhakaran would be adopted as her foster son and said that she would be performing his marriage as his mother.

The wedding occupied a 2-km long lighted baraat pathway, ten dining halls each accommodating 25,000 people, and a 75,000 square foot pandal. Tons of plywood, plaster of paris and paint were used to erect cut-outs of Jayalalitha, arches, several hundred papier-mache statues, elaborate facades of palaces and gateways. The VIP invitations included a silver plate enclosed in a container, a silk saree and a silk dhoti, each worth ₹20,000. The marriage hosted more than 1,000 VIPs. More than 40,000 guests were granted accommodation in the hotel. A legion of elephants and chefs brought in from Kerala. The incident, hailed as "the mother of all marriages". People's anger  mounted against her as the crores were lavished at the wedding, and Jayalalithaa and Sasikala became symbols of corruption. She was accused of using government money to celebrate the grand marriage. The marriage may have triggered the AIADMK to lose all 39 Lok Sabha seats in the 1996 general election.

She was later sentenced for 4 years in jail in 2014 for corruption related to the marriage and the Disproportionate assets case.

Jayalalithaa owns a Guinness Book of World Records for conducting the luxury wedding. The record shows that over 15,000 guests have been invited. The Income-Tax Dept estimated the cost of the wedding at ₹10 crore.

Jayalalithaa later disowned Sudhakaran as her foster son.

1998 TANSI land deal case 

The TANSI land deal case refers to the purchase of land by Jaya Publications, which included Jayalalithaa and her friend Sasikala, from the State Small Industry Company, Tansi, Guindy. Justice P Anbhazhagan delivered the judgment, and said that the evidence stated in the prosecution sheet, and that the sale deed of the prime land in Guindy had been carried out on 29 May 1992, in the unequivocal aim of cheating against the government. The Supreme Court disqualified her in September 2001, resulting in her stepping down and which made O. Panneerselvam as the chief minister of Tamil Nadu. The Madras High Court acquitted her and other 5 accused in the case of all the charges on 4 December 2001.

Disproportionate assets case 
Jayalalithaa was initially convicted of misusing her office during her tenure in 1991–1996. Subramanian Swamy was the main petitioner. Some of the accusations concerned expenditure on her foster son's luxurious marriage in 1996 and acquiring properties worth more than 66.65 crore, as well as jewellery, bank deposits, investment and a convoy of luxury vehicles. The trial lasted for 18 years. Justice John Michael D'Cunha, in a detailed judgement, showed that the entire asset belonged to the accused and no one else. On 11 May 2015, Jayalalithaa was acquitted of all charges by the High Court of Karnataka. On 14 February 2017, the Supreme Court of India overruled the High Court of Karnataka. Sasikala and the other accused were convicted and sentenced to four years in prison, as well as to a fine of ₹10 crore each.

2000 Pleasant Stay hotel case 

Pleasant Stay hotel case is the construction of the seven-story hotel "Pleasant stay" in Kodaikanal, which was in breach of the rules for the construction of the seven-story building in a blue ville in the tourist resort town in Kodaikanal. Jayalalithaa, Selvaganapathy and Pandey granted a permission to create a seven-story structure at the hotel. The case was related to Jayalalithaa's supposed clearance by violating government rules to the development of a hotel in ecologically significant Kodaikanal. Jayalalithaa was sentenced in February 2000 to one year's strict imprisonment, with the penalty fined Rs.1000 for conspiracy and criminal misconduct as a public employee. After the court's decision, AIADMK cadres started to riot and arson which burned alive three female students in the Dharmapuri bus burning and many were killed and injured. The Supreme Court disqualified her in September 2001, resulting in her stepping down and which made O. Panneerselvam as the chief minister of Tamil Nadu. The Madras High Court acquitted her and other 5 accused in the case of all the charges on 4 December 2001.

Illness, death and reactions 

On 22 September 2016, Jayalalithaa was admitted to Apollo Hospitals in Chennai, as she was suffering from an infection and acute dehydration. Her official duties were handed over to her minister O. Panneerselvam on 12 October 2016, though she continued to remain as the chief minister of the state. She was also said to be suffering from a severe pulmonary infection and septicaemia, which were cured. On 4 December 2016, she was re-admitted to the intensive care unit after suffering a cardiac arrest around 16:45 on the evening. The hospital released a press statement stating that her condition was "very critical" and that she was on life support. On 5 December 2016, the hospital announced her death around 23:30 and she became the first female chief minister to die in office in India.

Government of India declared a one-day national mourning with the national flag in all government buildings flying at half-mast. While a seven-day state mourning from 6 to 12 December 2016 was observed by Government of Tamil Nadu, also three day state mourning from 6 to 8 December 2016 were observed by Government of Kerala and the Government of Puducherry. One day state mourning on 6 December 2016 was observed by Government of Karnataka,Government of Bihar,Government of West Bengal,Government of Punjab,Government of Uttarakhand and Government of Goa. President Pranab Mukherjee, Prime Minister Narendra Modi, Union Ministers, Several State Chief Ministers, Political leaders and Film fraternity Condoled and paid last tributes on her demise. Her body was kept in state at her residence Veda Nilayam in Poes Garden until the wee hours of 6 December 2016 and later at Rajaji Hall for public to pay their tribute. Her last rites were performed on the evening of 6 December 2016 and she was buried at the northern end of the Marina Beach in Chennai in a sandalwood casket engraved with "Puratchi Thalaivi Selvi J Jayalalithaa", near the grave of her mentor M. G. Ramachandran at the MGR Memorial.

The US and several other countries sent condolences. American Ambassador Richard Verma, French Ambassador Alexandre Ziegler, Canadian High Commissioner to India Nadir Patel, Sri Lankan President Maithripala Sirisena, Sri Lankan Prime Minister Ranil Wickremesinghe, Former Sri Lankan president Mahinda Rajapaksa, Singapore Foreign Affairs Minister Vivian Balakrishnan and Malaysian Indian Congress Party Mourned her death. Then Malaysian Prime Minister Najib Razak also sent his condolences.

The News of Jayalalithaa's demise was covered by International Media.

On 11 December 2016, the AIADMK said that over 470 party workers died, 'shocked' by Jayalalithaa's demise, and announced a solatium of Rs 300,000 to each of their families.

In September 2017, C. Sreenivaasan of AIADMK courted controversy by saying that V. K. Sasikala's family was responsible for Jayalalithaa's death. Sreenivasan said that he had to lie about the late chief minister's death because of pressure.

On 12 September 2017, Late J. Jayalalithaa was named the eternal general secretary of AIADMK at the AIADMK general council .

The Memorial of Jayalalithaa

A memorial was built for her at a cost of ₹500 million rupees. The Jayalalithaa Memorial or the Amma Memorial is shaped like a phoenix. The Construction Works of Jayalalithaa's marina memorial started on 7 May 2018.

On 27 January 2021, The memorial of Jayalalithaa was inaugurated by then Chief Minister of Tamil Nadu Edappadi K. Palaniswami.

Death Probe by Justice Arumugaswamy commission

Among the Public, Jayalalithaa's 75-day hospitalisation and her demise, remained unclear and shrouded in secrecy. DMK and other opposition parties sought a probe into her death.

Timeline
 17 August 2017 – The one-man Commission by retired Justice was announced by then Chief Minister Edappadi K. Palaniswami.
 25 September 2017 – Justice A Arumughaswamy Commission was formally constituted by then Chief Minister Edappadi K. Palaniswami to investigate the death of J Jayalalithaa. 
 22 November 2017 – The Commission commenced its hearing.
The Commission had probed with hundreds of people including expert doctors, medical staff, ministers and then state health secretary of Tamil Nadu. London-based doctor Dr. Richard Beale was also summoned in front of the Commission in 2019 since he was closely involved with the selection of treatment provided to then Chief Minister Jayalalithaa. 
 23 July 2021 – The 11th extension granted for the commission to submit its report was extended by the state government.
 27 July 2021 – The Newly Elected DMK led Tamil Nadu Government sought permission from the Supreme Court to restart the inquiry into her death, as the inquiry into the mystery surrounding Jayalalithaa's death was one of the poll promises made by DMK in 2021 State Assembly Election.
 30 November 2021 – The Supreme Court passed orders to allow setting up a medical board of AIIMS doctors to help the Justice A. Arumughaswamy Commission of Inquiry in gathering facts and examining witnesses in the case. 
 7 March 2022 – The Commission resumed its hearing as the supreme court vacated the previous stay order. 
 26 April 2022 – The Commission completed its hearing nearly after 5 years. The Commission probed more than 150 witnesses including former chief minister O. Panneerselvam, V. K. Sasikala, Elavarasi, Several IAS and IPS officers.
 3 August 2022 – The final tenure extension was granted for the commission to submit its report by the state government. This was the 14th extension since its formation.
 4 August 2022 – The AIIMS panel gave clean chit to Apollo Hospitals and found no errors in the Jayalalithaa treatment.
 27 August 2022 – The Justice Arumughaswamy Commission finally submitted the 600-page report to the Chief Minister of Tamil Nadu M. K. Stalin after 5 years of its formation.
 18 October 2022 – The State Government tabled the Commission report in the Tamil Nadu Legislative Assembly. It raised doubts over the medical treatment given to former chief minister Jayalalithaa, It has recommended further probe against her aide V. K. Sasikala, the then health minister C. Vijayabaskar,  Dr. K. S. Sivakumar,  of Apollo Hospitals, Dr J. Radhakrishnan, former health secretary, former chief secretary P Rama Mohana Rao, among others, for what it called as “lapses”. The report also revealed that multiple people questioned during the probe said Jayalalithaa died on 4 December 2016, between 3 pm and 3:50 pm and not on 5 December 2016 as declared. It claimed that US doctor Samin Sharma had convinced the late CM Jayalalithaa to agree for an angio. It also questioned why she was not taken abroad for treatment even though Dr. Richard Beale was prepared to take the then Chief Minister.

In popular culture
In Mani Ratnam's political drama Iruvar (1997), the character of Kalpana portrayed by Aishwarya Rai, was inspired by Jayalalithaa and her professional and personal relationship with M. G. Ramachandran. In 2008 Dasavathaaram Movie, Uses She seeing flooding areas from helicopter. In Attahasa Movie, sources in July 2011 reported that Priyamani and Jayachitra were signed on to portray Muthulakshmi and the role of Chief Minister Jayalalitha, respectively Priyamani denied being part of the project, adding that she was not offered the role. Faisal Saif completed work on major portions of a film titled Amma between 2014 and 2016, but was forced to shelve it following threats from members of Jayalalithaa's political party. The makers denied that the film was a biopic, but stated that actress Ragini Dwivedi portrayed a role resembling the politician.

Since Jayalalithaa's death, several filmmakers have announced biopics on the politician, with six currently in production. In January 2017, Telugu filmmaker Dasari Narayana Rao registered the title Amma and began preparing for a biopic on the politician. The film was being planned with Anushka Shetty in the lead role, but Rao's death in May 2017 effectively ended the project, despite indications that Mohan Babu may revive it. Producer Adithya Bharadwaj announced that his team were over a year into pre-production work for a proposed biopic of Jayalalithaa, during December 2017. Titled Thaai: Puratchi Thalaivi, he revealed that it would predominantly be a fictionalised retelling of her story with some real life footage also included. Bharadwaj suggested that he had briefly touched upon the possibility of a biopic with Jayalalithaa when she was alive, but the script had to be reworked following her death. Despite his suggestions that the film would begin production in January 2018, the project did not take off. Soon after news emerged about Vijay's and Priyadarshini's biopics in August 2018, Adithya reconfirmed that Bharathiraja had been signed to be the director of the film. He added that the team were considering either Aishwarya Rai or Anushka Shetty for the role of Jayalalithaa, and either Kamal Haasan or Mohanlal for the role of M. G. Ramachandran.

In August 2018, producer Vishnu Vardhan Induri of Vibri Media announced that he was working on a biopic of Jayalalithaa, and that A. L. Vijay would direct the project. The team announced that pre-production work and research was ongoing and that the film would focus on the personal life of the politician, showing her vulnerable side. Actresses including Nayanthara and Vidya Balan were initially approached by Vijay to star in the lead role, while Sai Pallavi was considered for the supporting role of V. K. Sasikala. Titled Thalaivii (2021), the film began its shoot after a long pre-production phase in November 2019 with Kangana Ranaut signed to play the lead role. The Movie  was released on 10 September 2021. Within a day of Induri's announcement of making a film, director Priyadarshini announced that she had also been working for four months on the pre-production of a biopic, which would be launched in September 2018. Priyadarshini suggested that she had four scripts ready, with each focusing on different aspects of Jayalalithaa's life, and that the narration would be balanced by showing both her positive and negative sides. Titled The Iron Lady, Nithya Menen was signed on to play the lead role, while Aishwarya Rajesh and Varalaxmi Sarathkumar were in talks for a supporting role for the character of Sasikala.

On 14 December 2019, Another biopic named Queen has been released as a web-series by Gautham Vasudev Menon became the fourth such announcement of a related project in August 2018. Production on the series progressed quietly throughout late 2018, with Ramya Krishnan selected to play Jayalalithaa, and Indrajith and Vamsi Krishna portraying M. G. Ramchandran and Sobhan Babu respectively. In October 2018, Sasikala's nephew Jeyanandh Dhivakaran announced a further biopic on Jayalalithaa, which would focus more on her relationship with Sasikala and M. Natarajan. Director Linguswamy was signed on to the project, and began pre-production work by meeting close aides and politicians of Jayalalithaa. In April 2019, director Jegadeswara Reddy announced that he was set to make a film titled Sasilalithaa, which would showcase the relationship between Jayalalithaa and Sasikala. A first look poster was launched, with Reddy announcing that he would enter talks with Kajol and Amala Paul to play the lead roles.

Jayalalithaa also appeared in an episode of Rendezvous with Simi Garewal, an informal chat-show hosted by Indian actress Simi Garewal, where she talked about her personal life and acting/political career.

Elections contested and positions held

Tamil Nadu Legislative elections

Posts in Parliament of India

Posts in Tamil Nadu Legislative Assembly

Awards and honours 
 In 1972, J. Jayalalithaa was awarded the Kalaimamani by the Government of Tamil Nadu.
 Honorary doctorate received from University of Madras in 1991.
 Honorary doctorate received from The Tamil Nadu Dr. M.G.R. Medical University in 1992.
 Honorary doctorate received from Madurai Kamaraj University in 1993.
 Honorary doctorate received from Tamil Nadu Agricultural University in 2003.
 Honorary doctorate received from Bharathidasan University in 2003.
 In 2004, she was invited by the House of Lords, London to receive the "Woman Politician of the Decade Award" from the Asian Guild Awards.
 In 2004, The "Golden Star of Honor and Dignity Award" was conferred upon her by the Ukraine-based International Human Rights Defense Committee recognising her services in protecting the weaker section of society and in the field of gender equality in Tamil Nadu and India. Then United Nations Secretary General Kofi Annan, Russian President Vladimir Putin and Iceland Prime Minister David oddson were the only three previous recipients of the award
 In 2005, Honoured with 'Paul Harris Fellow Recognition' & 'Lifetime achievement Award' by Rotary International.
 In 2011, a resolution was passed by the New Jersey General Assembly to appreciate her exemplary excellence and dedication as a leader and in service to the people of Tamil Nadu.
 In 2018, Government of Tamil Nadu renamed Tamil Nadu Fisheries University after her as Tamil Nadu Dr. J. Jayalalithaa Fisheries University.
 In 2019, Government of Tamil Nadu named three Kalaimamani award after her as Puratchi Thalaivi Dr. J. Jayalalithaa Special Kalaimamani Award.
 In 2019, Government of Tamil Nadu renamed Tamil Nadu Music and Fine Arts University after her as The Tamil Nadu Dr. J. Jayalalithaa Music and Fine Arts University.
 In 2020, Government of Tamil Nadu renamed Tamil Nadu State Council for Higher Education Campus after her as Dr. J. Jayalalithaa Campus.
 On 31 July 2020, CMBT Metro Station in Chennai has been renamed as Puratchi Thalaivi Dr. J. Jayalalithaa CMBT Metro by Government of Tamil Nadu to honour her.

Works
Jayalalithaa wrote 4 full-fledged novels, columns for Bommai, Thuglak in the 1970s, short stories for Kalki, Thai in the 1980s. She had an insatiable desire in her mind to write her autobiography, but it was not fulfilled until the last.

Novels and Series
Uravin Kaidigal (Prisoners of a relationship) - The Tamil version of an English novel which she wrote for Eve's Weekly, a woman's magazine published from Mumbai. Kalki Rajendran had made a fervent appeal to Jayalalithaa to write the same in Tamil. Then It was published as a serial in Kalki in 1980 and attracted both strong criticism and praise.
 Oruthikhey Sondham (Belong to one) - Jayalalithaa's First Tamil 95-paged Novel Published in June 1980 by Kumudam's monthly, Malai Mathi Magazine.
Nenjile Oru Kanal (A fire in my heart) - Written in Kumudam Weekly Magazine, which she said was partly autobiographical.
Ennangal Sila (Some of the thoughts) - Published as Series in Thuglak Weekly Magazine for nearly 7 years, which was written anonymously by Jayalalithaa, Eventually Her identity was disclosed by the editor Cho Ramaswamy.
Nee indri Nanillai (I am not without you) - Novel Published in Valampuri John's Kavithabanu Publications.

Books
Manadhai Thotta Malargal (Flowers that touch the mind) - The Collective version of 45 Columns written as Enakku Pidithavai in Thai weekly magazine. In this book, she wrote about her favourites (Place, Flower, Animal, Song, Writer, Journalist, Philosophist, Teacher, Painter Leonardo da Vinci, Novel David Copperfield)

Short Stories and Columns
Jayalalithaa also carved many Short stories and Columns in Tamil and English. She had written an anonymous critic article in 'Thuglak' magazine which focused on the harassment of a woman under the police custody somewhere in North India.
In 'Thuglak' magazine, She wrote about Tamil Nadu Politics, National Politics and International Affairs. She also focused on writing about Negligence of Indian doctors, Italian law for pregnant women and The possibility of astrology. In 'Bommai' magazine, She also wrote about beauty tips.

Other interests

Countries visited

Jayalalithaa has travelled to countries such as United States, Singapore, Malaysia, China, Thailand, Japan, Nepal etc.

Leisure Interests

Jayalalithaa is also interested in reading, classical music, Western music, piano, swimming, cricket, tennis, basketball, chess, athletics and horse-riding. As a school girl, she had a huge crush on former Indian skipper Nari Contractor. In an interview with Simi Garewal in the 1990s, Jayalalitha had revealed her fondness for the cricketer and she had followed his game closely during the 1960s. In Kumudam Magazine, she had written that she used to watch Test matches. When she found difficult in booking last-minute tickets for special enclosure, she decided to become the Member of Tamil Nadu Cricket Association through which she could receive tickets automatically for all Test matches and Ranji Trophy. On her request, then famous cricket commentator and the general manager of Das prakash Group of Hotels P. Ananda Rao who had influence on TNCA, represented her case on his board meeting. Hence, Jayalalithaa became the first independent and patron women member of Tamil Nadu Cricket Association in the period of 1973–74.

Favourite Books

In an interview, Jayalalithaa said that when she was just eight years old, she used to read Rajaji's Mahabharata and Ramayana. Being a child, she was very fond of Hans Christian Andersen, Grimms and Enid Blyton's the Malory Towers series. In later years, She read the novel works of Denise Robins, Barbara Cartland, Mills and Boon. Her favourite authors were Charles Dickens, William Wordsworth, Jane Austen, Oscar Wilde, George Bernard Shaw, Sidney Sheldon, Danielle Steel, Pearl S. Buck, James Hadley Chase and Somerset Maugham.

She also read Shakespeare's plays, Danielle Steel's Malice, Jung Chang's Wild Swans, Jean Plaidy's series on the Tudor dynasty, Daniel Defoe's Robinson Crusoe, Arthur Conan Doyle's Sherlock Holmes, John Milton's Paradise Lost and Paradise Regained, Wayne Dyer's Wishes Fulfilled, Li Zhisui's The Private Life of Chairman Mao, Alexandre Dumas's The Three Musketeers and The Count of Monte Cristo. She liked books on history, geography, science, philosophy, religion, fiction, medicine and law. She had a great interest in reading about Anglo-Saxon dynasties.

Notes

See also 
 First Jayalalithaa ministry
 Second Jayalalithaa ministry
 Third Jayalalithaa ministry
 Fourth Jayalalithaa ministry
 Fifth Jayalalithaa ministry
 Sixth Jayalalithaa ministry

Further reading

References

External links 

In The Supreme Court Of India Criminal Appellate Jurisdiction
 Profile at BBC News
 
 BBC News article – Jayalalitha returns to power (dated 2 March 2002)
 BBC – Controversial life of Jayalalitha
 BBC Hardtalk RealPlayer video of Jayalalitha (RealPlayer required)
 
The Life And Times Of Jayalalitha  Outlook India Magazine

Jayalalithaa
1948 births
2016 deaths
20th-century Indian actresses
20th-century Indian women politicians
20th-century Indian politicians
21st-century Indian women politicians
21st-century Indian politicians
Actresses from Karnataka
Actresses in Hindi cinema
Actresses in Tamil cinema
Actresses in Telugu cinema
Actresses in Malayalam cinema
Actresses in Kannada cinema
All India Anna Dravida Munnetra Kazhagam politicians
Chief ministers from All India Anna Dravida Munnetra Kazhagam
Chief Ministers of Tamil Nadu
English film actresses
Filmfare Awards South winners
Heads of government who were later imprisoned
Indian actor-politicians
Indian film actresses
Indian Hindus
Indian politicians
Indian Tamil politicians
Leaders of the Opposition in Tamil Nadu
Tamil Nadu MLAs 1989–1991
Tamil Nadu MLAs 1991–1996
Tamil Nadu MLAs 2001–2006
Tamil Nadu MLAs 2006–2011
Tamil Nadu MLAs 2011–2016
Tamil Nadu MLAs 2016–2021
People from Mandya district
Tamil Nadu politicians
Tamil Nadu State Film Awards winners
Women chief ministers of Indian states
Women members of the Rajya Sabha
People of the Sri Lankan Civil War
Indian Peace Keeping Force
Indian politicians convicted of corruption
Women members of the Tamil Nadu Legislative Assembly